Alfred Smith (born 4 August 1850) was an architect who worked in a variety of locations in England, including Nottingham and the Forest of Dean.

Career
He was born on 4 August 1850 in Bungay, Suffolk, the son of Jessey Smith (b. 1826) and Jane Fish (1826-1900)

He married Susanna Anna Leeds, daughter of William Leeds of Reepham on 14 September 1872 in Christ Church, Radford, Nottingham and they had the following children:
Alfred William Smith (b. 1875)
Charles Edgar Smith (b. 1876)
Henry Edward Smith (b. 1878)
Francis James Smith (b. 1880)
Percy John Smith (1893-1970)

He set up office in Bungay, Suffolk, but in 1874 he moved to Nottingham, By 1881 he was living in Mitcheldean, Gloucestershire and was architect to the Forest of Dean Schools Board. By 1891 he was living in Dedham, Essex and was described as a retired architect. In the 1901 he is recorded as a farmer in Westleton in Suffolk, but in 1911 he was living at 3 Lulworth Villas, Maumbury Way, Dorchester and described again as a retired architect.

Buildings
Church of St John the Baptist, Wellington, Somerset, reredos 1874
Bridlington Cemetery 1875
10, Low Pavement, Nottingham 1876 
Bridlington Cemetery Chapel 1880 
Bridlington Cemetery Lodge 1880 
Gas Company Offices, Tewkesbury Road, Cheltenham 1881
Steam Mills School, Cinderford, Gloucestershire 1881-82
Joy's Green School, Lydbrook, Gloucestershire 1883

References

1850 births
Architects from Suffolk
Year of death missing